Aristotelia lespedezae is a moth of the family Gelechiidae. It was described by Annette Frances Braun in 1930. It is found in North America, where it has been recorded from Alabama, Florida, Kentucky, Maine, North Carolina, Ohio, Oklahoma and West Virginia.

Adults are on wing from late May to October in Kentucky.

The larvae probably feed on Lespedeza species.

References

Moths described in 1930
Aristotelia (moth)
Moths of North America